Stadium Casablanca (also known as Mann-Filter for sponsorship reasons), was a sports club based in Zaragoza. The women's basketball section played in the Liga Femenina de Baloncesto until 2020 when the structure of the club was integrare into the Basket Zaragoza team.

Season by season

References

Women's basketball teams in Spain
Liga Femenina de Baloncesto teams
1948 establishments in Spain
Basketball teams established in 1948
Sport in Zaragoza
Basketball teams in Aragon